David Hirson (born 1958) is an American dramatist, best known for his award-winning Broadway comedies, La Bête and Wrong Mountain.

Biography
Hirson was born in New York City to actress Alice and playwright Roger O. Hirson. He was educated at the Rye Country Day School.  He studied at Oxford and Yale University, where he received a bachelor's degree in English literature.

Awards and nominations
 Awards
 1991 Outer Critics Circle John Gassner Playwriting Award – La Bête
 1992 Laurence Olivier Award for Best New Comedy – La Bête
 Nominations
 1991 Drama Desk Award for Outstanding New Play – La Bête

Bibliography

References

External links
 David Hirson official website
 

1958 births
Living people
20th-century American dramatists and playwrights
Laurence Olivier Award winners
Writers from New York City
Rye Country Day School alumni
Alumni of the University of Oxford
Yale University alumni